Alkemade is a surname. Notable people with the surname include: 

Guido Alkemade (born 1962), Dutch sailor
Kimberly Alkemade (born 1990), Dutch Paralympic athlete
Nicholas Alkemade (1922–1987), English Royal Air Force tail gunner